Ferne Koch (1913 – October 13, 2001) was an American photographer. 

Her work is included in the collections of the Museum of Fine Arts Houston, and the Dallas Museum of Art. Her archives are held by the University of Texas, Austin.

References

1913 births
2001 deaths
20th-century American photographers
20th-century American women artists